Limotettix is a genus of leafhoppers in the family Cicadellidae. There are at least 70 described species in Limotettix. Limotettix is the only genus in the tribe Limotettigini of the subfamily Deltocephalinae. A previously included genus, Frigartus, is now considered to be a junior synonym of Limotettix.

Species
These 76 species belong to the genus Limotettix:

 Limotettix adipatus Emeljanov 1966 c g
 Limotettix ainoicus Matsumura 1902 c g
 Limotettix angustatus Osborn 1915 c g
 Limotettix anthracinus Van Duzee, 1894 c g b
 Limotettix arctostaphyli (Ball, 1899) c g b
 Limotettix atricapilla Boheman 1845 c g
 Limotettix aviger Emeljanov, 1966 g
 Limotettix awae Myers 1924 c g
 Limotettix balli Medler 1958 c g
 Limotettix beameri Medler 1958 c g
 Limotettix bisoni Knull 1952 c g
 Limotettix brooksi Hamilton 1994 c g
 Limotettix bullata Ball 1902 c g
 Limotettix cacheola Ball 1928 c g
 Limotettix chadchalicus Dlabola 1967 c g
 Limotettix comptoniana Ball 1928 c g
 Limotettix conservatus Hamilton 1994 c g
 Limotettix cuneatus Sanders & DeLong 1920 c g
 Limotettix danmai Kuoh 1981 c g
 Limotettix dasidus Medler 1955 c g
 Limotettix divaricatus Sanders & DeLong 1923 c g
 Limotettix elegans Hamilton 1994 c g
 Limotettix emeljanovi Hamilton 1994 c g
 Limotettix ferganensis Dubovsky, 1966 c g b
 Limotettix finitimus Van Duzee 1925 c g
 Limotettix flavopicta Ishihara 1953 c g
 Limotettix frigidus Ball 1899 c g
 Limotettix glomerosa Ball 1910 c g
 Limotettix harrisi Knight 1975 c g
 Limotettix humidus Osborn 1915 c g
 Limotettix identicus Tishechkin 2003 c g
 Limotettix incerta Evans 1966 c g
 Limotettix instabilis Van Duzee 1893 c g
 Limotettix kryptus (Medler, 1955) c g b
 Limotettix kuwayamai Ishihara 1966 c g
 Limotettix luteola Sleesman 1929 c g
 Limotettix medleri Hamilton 1994 c g
 Limotettix melastigmus Medler 1955 c g
 Limotettix minuendus Hamilton 1994 c g
 Limotettix myralis Medler 1958 c g
 Limotettix nigrax Medler, 1943 c g b
 Limotettix nigristriatus Hamilton 1994 c g
 Limotettix obesura Hamilton, 1994 c g b
 Limotettix ochrifrons Vilbaste 1973 c g
 Limotettix omani Medler 1955 c g
 Limotettix onukii Matsumura 1902 c g
 Limotettix osborni Ball, 1928 c g b
 Limotettix pallidus Knight 1975 c g
 Limotettix parallelus (Van Duzee, 1891) c g b
 Limotettix plutonius (Uhler, 1877) c g b
 Limotettix pseudosphagneticus Hamilton 1994 c g
 Limotettix pseudostriola Vilbaste 1965 c g
 Limotettix pullatus Evans 1941 c g
 Limotettix salinus Emeljanov 1966 c g
 Limotettix schedia Hamilton c g
 Limotettix scudderi Hamilton 1994 c g
 Limotettix shasta Ball 1916 c g
 Limotettix sphagneticus Emeljanov, 1964 g
 Limotettix strictus Hamilton 1994 c g
 Limotettix striola Fallén 1806 c g
 Limotettix symphoricarpae Ball 1901 c g
 Limotettix tachyporias Kirkaldy 1907 c g
 Limotettix taramus Medler 1958 c g
 Limotettix transversa Fallén 1826 c
 Limotettix transversus c g
 Limotettix truncatus Sleesman 1929 c g
 Limotettix tuvensis Vilbaste 1980 c g
 Limotettix typhae Vilbaste 1968 c g
 Limotettix uhleri Ball 1911 c g
 Limotettix uneolus Ball 1929 c g
 Limotettix urnura Hamilton 1994 c g
 Limotettix vaccinii Van Duzee 1890 c g
 Limotettix varus Ball, 1901 c g b
 Limotettix vilbasticus Dlabola 1967 c g
 Limotettix xanthus Hamilton 1994 c g
 Limotettix zacki Hamilton 1994 c g

Data sources: i = ITIS, c = Catalogue of Life, g = GBIF, b = Bugguide.net

References

Further reading

External links

 

Cicadellidae genera
Limotettigini